The Michelson Medical Research Foundation is a private, non-profit philanthropy founded by orthopedic spinal surgeon and inventor Gary K. Michelson. The foundation aims to solve global health issues by promoting the development of innovative ideas in medicine and bioscience.

The foundation's co-chairs are Dr. Michelson and his wife, Alya Michelson.

History 

The Michelson Medical Research Foundation was founded in 2005 and seeded with $100 million.

In 2017, the foundation, along with the Human Vaccines Project, established the Michelson Prizes: Next Generation Grants, a $20 million initiative to advance innovation in the field of vaccines and immunotherapies through grants.The inaugural winners of the $150,000 awards in June 2018 included the University of Melbourne's Dr. Laura Mackay, Monash University's Dr. Patricia Illing, and Stanford University School of Medicine's Dr. Ansuman Satpathy.2022 grant winners included Dr. Noam Auslander and Dr. Brittany Hartwell of the University of Minnesota.

Initiatives 

 The USC Michelson Center for Convergent Bioscience: Inaugurated on November 1, 2017, The USC Michelson facility—the largest research building located at the University of Southern California—provides a revolutionary environment for collaborative research.

 The Michelson Entrepreneurship Award seeks to drive technological innovation in healthcare at the Wharton Startup Challenge.

 The Michelson Ethical Research & Education Initiative: a partnership between the Michelson Medical Research Foundation and the Physicians Committee for Responsible Medicine aimed at ending the use of dogs and other animals in medical education and various types of medical research such as alcohol abuse research, heart failure research.

Beneficiaries 
Beneficiaries of the Michelson Medical Research Foundation include:

 The Human Vaccines Project. 
 The Physicians Committee for Responsible Medicine. 
 The University of Southern California. 
 The University of Washington. 
 The Wharton School of the University of Pennsylvania.

References

External links 

 Official website

Health charities in the United States
Organizations established in 2005
Medical and health organizations based in California